Dadayama (The Hunt) is a 1983 Sri Lankan Sinhala drama thriller film directed by Vasantha Obeysekera and co-produced by Rabbin Chandrasiri, Sunil Jayasiri and P.A Somadasa for Canfo Films. It stars Ravindra Randeniya and Swarna Mallawarachchi in lead roles along with Somy Rathnayake and Iranganie Serasinghe. Music composed by Premasiri Khemadasa. It is the 558th Sri Lankan film in the Sinhala cinema.

Cast    
 Ravindra Randeniya as Jayanath 
 Swarna Mallawarachchi as Rathmali
 Somy Rathnayake as Jacolis
 Iranganie Serasinghe as Brothel owner
 Rathnawali Kekunawela as Rathmali's mother
 Shirani Kaushalya as Renuka
 Nanda Withana as Duplicate registrar
 Malaka Chathurath as Rathmali's son
 Daya Alwis as Minister
 Granville Rodrigo as Peter's companion
 J.H. Jayawardana as Peter
 Avanthi Aponso as Rathmali's friend
 Rathmali Gunasekara as Rathmali's elder sister
 Anushi Wijegunawardena as Prostitute

References

External links
Sri Lanka Cinema Database
 

1984 films
1980s Sinhala-language films
1980s thriller drama films
Sri Lankan thriller drama films
1984 drama films